The Morgan Union Pacific Depot, at 98 N. Commercial St. in Morgan, Utah, was built in 1926.

It was listed on the National Register of Historic Places in 2011.

It has also been known as the Morgan Union Pacific Railroad Depot and as Morgan Station.

It may have been designed by Gilbert Stanley Underwood.

It was used as a passenger depot until 1972.  A freight portion of the depot was moved to a new location.

It was later used as Morgan's Planning & Zoning office.

References

		
National Register of Historic Places in Morgan County, Utah
Mission Revival architecture in Utah
Buildings and structures completed in 1926